Evgeniy Aleksandrovich Garanichev (born 13 February 1988) is a Russian biathlete, who has been competing on the World Cup circuit since the 2010–11 season. He has had five Top 10 finishes in World Cup races in individual races. He got his first win in individual races on 3 February 2012.

Career

2011 Winter Universiade
Evgeniy participated in 2011 Winter Universiade and got 3 medals.

2010–11 World Cup Season
His debut was in Antholz, Italy. It was his only event.

2011–12 World Cup Season
He started his second season in Östersund, Sweden with 10 place in individual and 63 in sprint. In Hochfilzen, Austria he was 30 and 32 in sprint and pursuit. After this he was out from World Cup team. He won sprint and pursuit in IBU Cup in Obertilliach. In Oberhof relay was only his race and he scored first podium – 2 place. In Nové Město, Czech Republic he returned to World Cup with his best individual result in career – 7 place in pursuit. In Antholz, Italy he scored his first individual World Cup podium – 2 in sprint. In Oslo, Norway he scored his first win (sprint) and finished 3rd in Pursuit and Mass start. He entered to Oslo's events at 25 place in World Cup Standings and jumped up to 15 place after Mass start. At the Biathlon World Championships 2012 he competed in sprint, pursuit, mass start and relay. His best finish was 9th place at mass start and 6th at relay. In sprint and pursuit he was 14 and 12. At the overall standings he was at 12th position with 585 points after 20 races from 26. He collected 1 win, 1 2nd place and 2 3rd place finishes in personal races and once he was 2nd at relay.

2012–13 World Cup Season
2012–13 World Cup season was first full-schedule season for Evgeniy. His first race was individual race in Östersund, Sweden. He finished at 19th place. The same result he did in sprint and his first finish in Top10 was in pursuit – 9th place. In Hochfilzen, Austria's sprint he demonstrated worst result since 2011–12 Östersund, Sweden's sprint (63rd) – he was 45th, but on the next day he gained 32 places and finished 13th. In Pokljuka, Slovenia he showed his best results of the season to the date in sprint – 14th place and pursuit – 4th place. In Oberhof he scored 3 podiums in 3 races: he has run 2nd leg in relay, which Russia win. After this he was twice at 2nd place in sprint and pursuit, right behind his teammate Dmitry Malyshko. He entered at the WC 4 at 8th place and after sprint and pursuit he jumped up to 5th place.

Results

Olympics

World Championships

*The single mixed relay was added as an event in 2019.

Winter Universiade

Individual victories

*Results are from IBU races which include the Biathlon World Cup, Biathlon World Championships and the Winter Olympic Games.

Biathlon World Cup
Overall record

Season Standings

*Key:Races—number of entered races/all races; Points—won World Cup points; Position—World Cup season ranking.

References

External links
 

1988 births
Living people
People from Perm Krai
Russian male biathletes
Biathletes at the 2014 Winter Olympics
Olympic biathletes of Russia
Medalists at the 2014 Winter Olympics
Olympic medalists in biathlon
Olympic bronze medalists for Russia
Holmenkollen Ski Festival winners
Universiade medalists in biathlon
Universiade silver medalists for Russia
Universiade bronze medalists for Russia
Competitors at the 2011 Winter Universiade
Sportspeople from Perm Krai